Sidney McNeil Tobias (born 20 March 1989) is a South African rugby union player. 
His regular position is hooker.

Career

Youth

Tobias went to school at Paul Roos Gymnasium in Stellenbosch, where he earned a selection to play for the  side that participated at the Grant Khomo Week in 2005. He progressed further through the youth structures at Western Province, also playing for their Under-18 sides at the Academy Week in 2006 and the Craven Week competition in 2007.

In joined their academy, the Western Province Rugby Institute, when he finished school at the end of 2007. He represented the s in the 2008 Under-19 Provincial Championship and the Under-21s in 2009 and 2010.

Western Province

Tobias was included in 's squad for the 2009 Vodacom Cup, but didn't make any appearances.

After playing at Under-21 level for the remainder of 2010, he returned to the Vodacom Cup side in 2011. He played in a compulsory friendly match against  prior to the 2011 Currie Cup Premier Division season, but didn't feature in the competition proper.

Tobias once again played the entire Vodacom Cup campaign in 2012, playing in all seven regular season matches (starting six of those) as Western Province topped the Southern Section. He also started the final against  in Kimberley, playing the entire 80 minutes as Western Province ran out 20–18 winners to win the title for the first time.

SWD Eagles

The 2012 Vodacom Cup final turned out to be Tobias' last in Western Province colours, instead opting to move to fellow Western Cape side  prior to the 2012 Currie Cup First Division. He played in all twelve of their remaining matches in the competition, making four starts but generally playing off the bench as a second-choice hooker to Hansie van Dyk. The  eventually finished the season in fifth position, losing out on a play-off spot in the process.

Blue Bulls / UP Tuks

He made just one appearance for UP Tuks in the 2013 Varsity Cup, playing off the bench in their match against  in Potchefstroom. He scored a try within two minutes of his introduction and almost helped UP Tuks turn around the 24–0 half-time score, with the game ending in a 26–23 victory to NWU.

Griquas

Tobias remained overlooked for the ' Currie Cup side, however, and in October 2014 it was announced that he would move to Kimberley to join  for the 2015 season.

Zebre

Tobias moved to Italian Pro12 side Zebre at the start of 2017. He made just four appearances as a replacement during the 2016–17 Pro12, playing a total of 54 minutes, and was released at the end of the season.

Personal

He is the son of former Springbok fly-half Errol Tobias.

References

South African rugby union players
Living people
1989 births
People from Theewaterskloof Local Municipality
Rugby union hookers
Blue Bulls players
Griquas (rugby union) players
SWD Eagles players
Western Province (rugby union) players
Zebre Parma players
Bulls (rugby union) players
Rugby union players from the Western Cape